The Enchelei were an ancient people that lived around the region of Lake Shkodra and Lake Ohrid, in modern-day Albania, Montenegro, and North Macedonia. They are one of the oldest known peoples of the eastern shore of the Adriatic Sea. In ancient sources they sometimes appear as an ethnic group distinct from the Illyrians, but they are mostly mentioned as one of the Illyrian tribes. They held a central position in the earlier phase of Illyrian history.

In ancient Greek literature they are linked with the end of the mythical narrative of Cadmus and Harmonia. The name Sesarethii was used by Strabo as an alternative name for the Enchelei in the lakeland area of Ohrid. Mentioned for the first time by Hecataeus of Miletus in the 6th century BC, the name Sesarethii/Sesarethioi is also considered a variant of Dassaretii/Dassaretioi, an Illyrian tribe that has been recorded since Roman times and that is attested in coinage and inscriptions found around lake Ohrid. The weakening of the kingdom of the Enchelei presumably led to Enchelei's assimilation and inclusion into a newly established Illyrian realm at the latest in the 6th–5th centuries BC, marking the arising of the Dassaretii, who appear to have replaced the Enchelei in the lakeland area. During Classical and Hellenistic antiquity the Enchelei were more a historical memory than a contemporary group.

The region inhabited by the Enchelei was known as Enchele. Their neighbors to the west were the Taulantii, to the north the Autariatae, to the north-east the Dardani, to the south-east the Paeones, and to the south the Dexaroi.

Name 
The Enchelei are mentioned for the first time by Hecataeus of Miletus in the 6th century BC. The were also mentioned in ancient Greek literature as Enchelanes. The latter form includes the suffix -anes which is typical in the western Greek dialects spoken by their Greek neighbors. As such this makes it a native form of the name compared to Enchelei which has been influenced by Ionic Greek.

According to E. Hamp, a connection with Albanian ngjalë makes it possible that the name Enchele was derived from the Illyrian term for eels, which may have been anciently related to Greek and simply adjusted to the Greek pronunciation. In Polybius the word is written with a voiceless aspirate kh, Enchelanes, while in Mnaseas it was replaced with a voiced ng, Engelanes, the latter being a typical feature of the Ancient Macedonian and northern Paleo-Balkan languages.

An alternative name for the Enchelei in the lakeland area of Ohrid is recorded by Strabo as Sesarethii. The name Sesarethioi is mentioned for the first time by Hecataeus of Miletus in the 6th century BC. Hecataeus reported that the tribe of Chelidonioi lived to the north of the Sesarethioi. Furthermore he reports that Sesarethos was a Taulantian city, with Sesarethioi as its ethnicon. The name Sesarethii/Sesarethioi is also considered a variant of Dassaretii/Dassaretioi, an Illyrian tribe that has been recorded since Roman times and that is attested in coinage and inscriptions found around lake Ohrid.

Mythological accounts 
A legend widespread in antiquity reports that Cadmus – a Phoenician prince who became king of Thebes, and a Boeotian and Enchelean figure –  with his wife  Harmonia arrived among the Enchelei and helped them build many towns on the shores of Lake Ohrid and Lake Shkodra, among them Lychnidus (Ohrid) and Bouthoe (Budva). As the legend says it, at that time the Enchele were at war with neighboring Illyrian tribes and Cadmus after orders from the Oracle became leader of the people and came to their aid. After the victory against the Illyrians, the Enchele chose Cadmus as their king.

A mythological tradition reported by Appian (2nd century AD) tells that the Enchelei were among the South-Illyrian tribes that took their names from the first generation of the descendants of Illyrius, the eponymous ancestor of all the Illyrian peoples. According to Appian's account the progenitor to the Enchele was Encheleus, a son of Illyrius. 

According to a legendary account reported by Polybius, cited by Stephanus of Byzantium, after the disappearance of Amphiaraus during the siege of Thebes, his carioteer Baton settled in Illyria, near the country of the Enchelei.

History 

In southern Illyria organized states were formed earlier than in other areas of  this region. The oldest known state in the region which can be discussed about from ancient sources is that of the Encheli. The height of the Enchelean state was from the 8th–7th centuries BC, but the kingdom fell from dominant power around the 6th century BC. It seems that the weakening of the kingdom of Enchelae resulted in their assimilation and inclusion into a newly established Illyrian realm at the latest in the 6th–5th century BC, marking the arising of the Dassareti, who appear to have replaced the Enchelei in the lakeland area (Ohrid and Prespa).

The Enchelei were often at war with the northern Greeks. From written sources from Greek writers such as Herodotus, the Enchelean army is even recorded attacking the temple of Delphi. Justin (2nd century AD) reports that at a time when the ruler of Macedonia was the infant Aeropus I (around 6th century BC), the Illyrians attacked successfully Macedonia until the infant ruler was brought to a battle by his Macedonian subjects, benefitting from his presence and avenging their initial defeat against the Illyrians. The name of the specific Illyrian tribe or group of tribes that attacked Macedonia is not reported in Justin's account, but it has been suggested that they would have been either the Enchelei, whose realm was centered at that time in the area of Lake Lychnidus, or the Taulantii, who were based farther west, in the coastal area within and around Epidamnos and Apollonia. The Illyrian raids against the Argeads who were based at Aegae indicate that Illyrian attacks also involved the Upper Macedonian regions of Lynkestis, Orestis and Eordaea, Elimea, and Tymphaea, as they were located between Illyrian territory and Argead lands.

See also 

List of ancient Illyrian peoples and tribes
List of ancient tribes in Illyria

Notes

References

Bibliography 

Illyrian tribes
Illyrian Albania
Illyrian Montenegro
Illyrian North Macedonia
Ancient tribes in Albania
Ancient tribes in Montenegro
Ancient tribes in North Macedonia